Barrow Hall is in the village of Great Barrow, in the civil parish of Barrow, Cheshire, England.  It is recorded in the National Heritage List for England as a designated Grade II listed building.

The building dates from the late 17th and the 18th centuries, with later additions.  It is constructed in brick with a slate roof, and consists of a two and three-storey house with an attached cottage.  There is a three-storey gabled porch to the rear. The front of the building is in seven bays. The windows are casements.

See also

Listed buildings in Barrow, Cheshire

References

External links 
 

Country houses in Cheshire
Grade II listed buildings in Cheshire
Grade II listed houses